The following is a list of works by Venetian playwright and librettist Carlo Goldoni (1707–1793).

Tragedies 
 Amalasunta, burned by Goldoni after its premiere (1733)
 Belisario (1734)
 Rosmonda (1734)
 Griselda (1734)
 Enrico re di Sicilia (1736)
 Gli amori di Alessandro Magno (1759)
 Enea nel Lazio (1760)
 Nerone (1760)
 Artemisia (never performed)

Tragicomedies 
Belisario (1734)
Don Giovanni Tenorio o sia Il dissoluto, "The Dissolute" (1735)
Rinaldo di Montalbano (1736)
Giustino (17??)
La sposa persiana, "The Persian Wife", in verse (1753)
Ircana in Julfa, "Ircana in Jaffa" (17??)
Ircana in Ispaan, "Ircana in Isfahan" (17??)
La peruviana, "The Peruvian Woman" (17??)
La bella selvaggia, "The Savage Beauty" (17??)
La dalmatina, "The Dalmatian Woman" (1758)
Gli amori di Alessandro Magno, "The Loves of Alexander the Great" (17??)
Artemisia, "Artemisia" (17??)
Enea nel Lazio, "Aeneas in Latium" (17??)
Zoroastro, "Zoroaster" (17??)
La bella giorgiana, "The Georgian Beauty" (1761)

Comedies 

Un curioso accidente, "A Curious Mishap" (1760)
L'uomo di mondo, "The Man of the World" (17??)
Il prodigo, "The Prodigal Man" (17??)
Il Momolo cortesan, partly written, partly improvised (1738), "Momolo the Court Man"
Il mercante fallito o sia La bancarotta, "The Bankrupted Merchant" or "The Bankruptcy" (1741)
La donna di garbo (1743), "The Fashionable Woman"
Il servitore di due padroni, (1745) "The Servant of Two Masters" (now often retitled Arlecchino servitore di due padroni "Harlequin Servant of two Masters")
Il frappatore (17??)"The deceiver"
I due gemelli veneziani, "The Two Venetian Twins" (1745) 
L'uomo prudente, "The Prudent Man" (17??)
La vedova scaltra, "The Shrewd Widow" (1748)
La putta onorata, "The Honorable Maid" (1749)
La buona moglie, "The Good Wife" (1749)
Il cavaliere e la dama, "The Gentleman and the Lady" (1749)
L'avvocato veneziano, "The Venetian Lawyer" (17??)
Il padre di famiglia, "The Father of the Family" (17??)
La famiglia dell'antiquario, "The Antiquarian's Family" (1750)
L'erede fortunata, "The Lucky Heiress" (1750)
Il teatro comico, "The Comical Theatre" (1750–1751) 
Le femmine puntigliose,  "The Obstinate Women" (1750–1751)
La bottega del caffè, "The Coffee Shop" (1750–1751)
Il bugiardo, "The Liar" (1750–1751)
L'adulatore, "The Flatterer" (17??)
Il poeta fanatico, "The Fanatical Poet" (1750)
La Pamela, "Pamela" (17??)
Il cavaliere di buon gusto, "The Gentleman with Good Taste" (17??)
Il giuocatore, "The Gambler" (1750)
Il vero amico, "The True Friend" (1750) translated by Anna Cuffaro
La finta ammalata, "The Fake Patient Woman" (1750–1751)
La dama prudente, "The Prudent Lady" (17??)
L'incognita, "The Unknown Woman" (17??)
L'avventuriere onorato, "The Honorable Scoundrel" (1750–1751)
I pettegolezzi delle donne, "Women's Gossip" (1750–1751)
La locandiera, "The Mistress of the Inn" (1751)
Il Molière, "Molière" (17??)
La castalda (17??)"The Female Administrator"
L'amante militare, "The Military Lover" (17??)
Il tutore, "The Guardian" (17??)
La moglie saggia, "The Wise Wife" (1752)
Il feudatario "The Feudal Lord" (1752) 
Le donne gelose, "The Jealous Women" (1752)
La serva amorosa, "The Loving Maid" (1752)
I puntigli domestici, "The Domestic Squabbles" (17??)
La figlia obbediente, "The Obedient Daughter" (17??)
I mercatanti, "The Merchants" (17??)
Le donne curiose, "The Curious Women" (1753)
Il contrattempo o sia Il chiacchierone imprudente, "The Unwelcome Event" or "The Careless Chatterbox" (17??)
La donna vendicativa, "The Vengeful Woman" (17??)
Opening sketch for the Teatro Comico di San Luca, 7 October 1753
Il geloso avaro, "The Jealous Miser" (17??)
La donna di testa debole, "The Feebleminded Woman" (17??)
La cameriera brillante, "The Brilliant Maidservant" (17??)
Il filosofo inglese, "The English Philosopher" (17??)
Il vecchio bizzarro, "The Bizarre Old Man" (17??)
Il festino, "The Banquet" (17??)
L'impostore, "The Impostor" (17??)
Opening sketch for the Teatro Comico di San Luca, fall season 1754
La madre amorosa, "The Loving Mother" (17??)
Terenzio, "Terentio" (17??)
Torquato Tasso, "Torquato Tasso" (17??)
Il cavaliere giocondo, "The Merry Gentleman" (17??)
Le massere (1755)"The Servant Girls"
I malcontenti, "The Unsatisfied Men" (17??)
Opening sketch for the Teatro Comico di San Luca, fall season, 1755
La buona famiglia, "The Good Family" (17??)
Le donne de casa soa, "The Women from His Own Home"(1755)
La villeggiatura, "The Vacation" (1761)
La donna stravagante, "The Extravagant Woman" (17??)
Il campiello (1756) "The Little Square"
L'avaro, "The Miser" (17??)
L'amante di se medesimo, "The Lover of Himself" (17??)
Il medico olandese, "The Dutch Doctor" (17??)
La donna sola, "The Lone Woman" (17??)
La pupilla, "The Female Ward" (1734)
Il cavaliere di spirito o sia La donna di testa debole, "The Witty Gentleman" or "The Feebleminded Woman" (17??)
La vedova spiritosa, "The Witty Widow" (17??)
Il padre per amore, "The Father for Love" (17??)
Lo spirito di contraddizione, "The Spirit of Contradiction" (17??)
Il ricco insidiato, "The Sought After Rich man" (17??)
Le morbinose
Le donne di buon umore, "The Good Humored Women" (17??)
L'apatista o sia L'indifferente, "The Apathic Man" or "The Indifferent Man" (17??)
La donna bizzarra, "The Bizarre Woman" (17??)
La sposa sagace, "The Clever Wife" (17??)
La donna di governo (17??)"The Government Woman"
La donna forte, "The Strong Woman" (17??)
I morbinosi (1759)?
La scuola di ballo, "The Dance School" (17??)
Gl'innamorati, "The Lovers" (1759)
Pamela maritata, "Pamela Married" (17??)
L'impresario delle Smirne, "Director of the Opera at Smyrna" (1759)
La guerra, "The War" (17??)
I rusteghi, "The Boors" (1760)
Il curioso accidente, "The Curious Incident" (1760)
La donna di maneggio (17??)"The Woman in Charge"
La casa nova, "The New House" (1760)
La buona madre, "The Good Mother" (1761)
Le smanie per la villeggiatura, "Pining for Vacation" (1761)
Le avventure della villeggiatura, "Holiday Adventures" (1761)
Il ritorno dalla villeggiatura, "Back from Vacation" (1761)
Lo scozzese, "The Scotsman" (17??)
Il buon compatriotto, "The Good Compatriot" (17??)
Il sior Todero brontolon o sia Il vecchio fastidioso, "Grumpy Mr. Todero or the Annoying Old Man" (1762)
Le baruffe chiozzotte (1762)"The Chioggia Scuffles"
Una delle ultime sere di carnevale, "One of the Last Carnival Evenings" (1762)
L'osteria della posta, "The Tavern at the Mail Station" (17??)
L'amore paterno o sia La serva riconoscente, "Paternal Love" or "The Grateful Maidservant" (17??)
Il matrimonio per concorso, "Marriage by Contest" (17??)
Les amours d'Arlequin et de Camille, "The Love of Harlequin And Camilla" (1763)
La jalousie d'Arlequin, "Harlequin's Jealousy" (1763)
Les inquiétudes de Camille, "Camilla's Worries" (1763)
Gli amori di Zelinda e Lindoro, "The Love of Zelinda and Lindoro" (1764)
La gelosia di Lindoro, "Lindoro's Jealousy" (17??)
L'inquietudini di Zelinda, "Zelinda's Worries" (17??)
Gli amanti timidi o sia L'imbroglio de' due ritratti, "The Shy Lovers" or "The Affair of the Two Portraits" (17??)
Il ventaglio, "The Fan" (1765)
La burla retrocessa nel contraccambio (17??)"The returned joke"
Chi la fa l'aspetti o sia I chiassetti del carneval (17??)"What goes around comes around" or "The Carnival Lanes"
Il genio buono e il genio cattivo, "The Good Nature and the Bad Nature" (17??)
Le bourru bienfaisant (1771)"The Benevolent Curmudgeon" (17??)
L'avare fastueux (1776)"The Ostentatious Miser"

Opera seria libretti 
 Amalasunta (1732)
 Gustavo primo, re di Svezia (c. 1738)
 Oronte, re de' Sciti (1740)
 Statira (c. 1740)

Opera buffa libretti
 La fondazione di Venezia (1734)
 La contessina (The Young Countess) by Maccari (1743)
 La favola dei tre gobbi (1748)
 L'Arcadia in Brenta (The Arcadia in Brenta) by Galuppi (1749)
 Il filosofo di campagna (The Country Philosopher) by Galuppi (1754)
 Il mercato di Malmantile (The Malmantile Market) by Fischietti (1757)
 La buona figliuola (The Good Girl) by Niccolò Piccinni (1760)
 La buona figliuola maritata by Piccinni (1761)
 La bella verità by Piccinni (1762)
 Lo speziale (The Apothecary) by Joseph Haydn (1768)
 La notte critica by Piccinni (1767)
 La finta semplice (The Fake Innocent) by Wolfgang Amadeus Mozart (1769)
 Le pescatrici (The Fisherwomen) by Haydn (1770)
 Il mondo della luna (The World on the Moon) by Haydn (1777)
 Vittorina by Piccinni (1777)
 Il festino
 I viaggiatori ridicoli
 Vittorina
 Il re alla caccia
 La bouillotte
 I volponi
 Gli uccellatori
 Arcifanfano, Re de' matti
 L'isola disabitata
 La calamita de' cuori
 Il negligente
 I bagni d'Abano
 Le virtuose ridicole
 Il finto principe
 L'astuzia felice
 Bertoldo, Bertoldino e Cascasenno
 I portentosi effetti della madre natura
 Lucrezia romana
 Il mondo alla rovescia
 Buovo d'Antona
 Il paese delle cuccagna
 La mascherata
 Il conte Caramella
 La donna di governo
 La fiera di Sinigaglia

Intermezzo libretti 
 Il buon padre, "The Good Father" (1729)
 La cantatrice, "The Singer" (1729)
 Il gondoliere veneziano o sia Gli sdegni amorosi, The Venetian Gondoliere or the Lover's Scorn (1733)
 La pupilla (1734)
 La birba (1734)
 Il quartiere fortunato (1734–44)
 Amor fa l'uomo cieco (uncertain date)
 Il disinganno (uncertain date)
 Le donne vendicate, "The Revenge of the Women" (1751)

Cantatas and serenades 
 La ninfa saggia, "The Wise Nymph" (1739)
 Gli amanti felici, "The Happy Lovers" (1739)
 Le quattro stagioni, "The Four Seasons" (1739)
 Il coro delle muse, "The Choir of the Muses" (1740)
 La pace consolata, "Peace Comforted" (17??)
 L'amor della patria, "Love for the Country" (17??)
 L'oracolo del Vaticano, "The Vatican's Oracle" (17??)

Oratorios 
 Magdalena conversio, "The Conversion of Magdalene" (17??)

Religious plays 
 L'unione del reale profeta Davide, "The Marriage of Royal Prophet David" (17??)

Performances 
 La metempsicosi o sia La pitagorica trasmigrazione, "The Metempsychosis" or "The Pythagorean Transmigration" (17??)
 Il disinganno in corte, "The Disappointment at the Court" (17??)

Poetry 
 Il colosso, a satire against Pavia girls which led to Goldoni being expelled from Collegio Ghislieri (1725)
 Il quaresimale in epilogo (1725–1726)

Books 
 Nuovo teatro comico, "New Comic Theater", plays. Pitteri, Venice (1757)
 Mémoires, "Memoirs". Paris (1787)
 Goldoni's collected works. Zalta, Venice (1788–1795)

Translations 
 La storia di Miss Jenny, "The Story of Miss Jenny" of Riccoboni, into French

Notes